"It Really Hurts Me Girl" is a song and single by American group, The Carstairs.

In the UK, DJ Ian Levine, having heard this song played on radio in Miami, acquired a copy and played it during a Northern soul event at the Blackpool Mecca in 1973. It caused controversy as it was not to the liking of those who preferred traditional Northern soul music based on a sound and rhythm similar to that traditionally emanating from the Motown label. The song is credited with stating a new musical genre that came to be known as modern soul music.

References

1973 songs
Northern soul songs